Ab Bid (also Romanized as Āb Bīd, ‘Ābed, and Ābīd) is a village in Dorud Rural District, in the Central District of Dorud County, Lorestan Province, Iran. At the 2006 census, its population was 26, in 5 families.

References 

Towns and villages in Dorud County